Abbesses (literally Abbesses) is a station on Paris Métro Line 12, in the Montmartre district and the 18th arrondissement. Abbesses is the deepest station in the Paris Métro, at 36 metres (118 feet) below ground, and is located on the western side of the butte (hill) of Montmartre. Access to the platforms is by elevator or the decorated stairs.

Location

Nearby are the Montmartre district, the Basilique du Sacré-Cœur de Montmartre (church), the Place du Tertre and the Église Saint-Jean-de-Montmartre (Art Nouveau church). The station is named after the Place des Abbesses, referring to the abbesses of the nearby abbey of the Dames-de-Montmartre.

History
The station opened on 30 January 1913, three months after the extension of the Nord-Sud company's line A from Pigalle to Jules Joffrin. On 27 March 1931, line A became line 12 of the Métro.

Station layout

Architecture

Though a Guimard original, the édicule at Abbesses was originally located at Hôtel de Ville and was transferred to its current location in 1974. The entrance is technically anachronistic, since line 12 of the Paris metro was built by a competing firm, the Nord-Sud Company, which did not hire Guimard but engaged other architects to design its stations and station entrances.

Abbesses in popular culture
 Abbesses is featured in Le Fabuleux destin d'Amélie Poulain; a working title for the film was Amélie des Abbesses (Amélie of the Abbesses). Though set at Abbesses station, the film was actually shot at Porte des Lilas station, which has a disused platform that has been specially set up for filming.
 The entrance to Abbesses metro station is featured near the beginning of music video for Howard Jones' What Is Love as well as several other locations around Paris
 Louis Vuitton has a messenger style bag in the Monogram Canvas line named after the station.
 A cartoon version of the station appears in the official music video for "Flowers", the ninth track on Émilie Simon.
 "Abbesses" is also where Minette's fashion studio is located in a Nancy Drew PC game Danger By Design.
 The French DJ crew Birdy Nam Nam has composed a musical piece called Abbesses.
 Featured in multiple scenes of the final episode of Netflix original series Sense8.

References

External links
Renovation works schedule from RATP web-site (French)

Paris Métro stations in the 18th arrondissement of Paris
Railway stations in France opened in 1912
Art Nouveau architecture in Paris
Art Nouveau railway stations